is a railway station in  the city of Ōmachi, Nagano, Japan, operated by East Japan Railway Company (JR East).  It is the starting point of the Tateyama Kurobe Alpine Route.

Lines
Shinano-Ōmachi Station is served by the Ōito Line and is 35.1 kilometers from the terminus of the line at Matsumoto Station.

Station layout
The station consists of one ground-level side platform and one island platform connected by a footbridge. the side platform is Platform 1 and is adjacent to the station building; the island platform has Platform 3 and Platform 4. There is no Platform 2. The station has a "Midori no Madoguchi" staffed ticket office.

Platforms

Bus terminal

Highway buses
 Chūō Kōsoku Bus; For Shinjuku Station
 For Nagano Station

Route buses
 For Ōgizawa Station

Passenger statistics
In fiscal 2015, the station was used by an average of 1,443 passengers daily (boarding passengers only).

History
Shinano-Ōmachi Station opened on 5 July 1916. With the privatization of Japanese National Railways (JNR) on 1 April 1987, the station came under the control of JR East.

Surrounding area
Omachi Post Office

Omachi Mountaineering Museum

See also
 List of railway stations in Japan

References

External links

 JR East station information 
Tateyama Kurobe Alpine Route official website

Railway stations in Nagano Prefecture
Ōito Line
Railway stations in Japan opened in 1916
Stations of East Japan Railway Company
Tateyama Kurobe Alpine Route
Ōmachi, Nagano